Róbert Feczesin (born 22 February 1986) is a Hungarian professional footballer who plays as a striker for Vasas.

He has played twelve times for Hungary scoring four goals, including one in a win against world champions Italy on 22 August 2007.

He won his first cap against Mexico on 14 December 2005.

Career statistics

Club

International goals

Honours
Újpest
 Nemzeti Bajnokság I Runner-up: 2005–06, 2003–04

Debrecen
 Nemzeti Bajnokság I: 2009–10
 Hungarian Cup: 2009–10
 Hungarian League Cup: 2010

Videoton
 Nemzeti Bajnokság I: 2014-15

References

External links
 Hlsz.hu profile
 Profil on bresciaonline.it 
  
 
 
 
 
 
 

1986 births
Living people
People from Dabas, Hungary
Association football forwards
Hungarian footballers
Hungary international footballers
Újpest FC players
FC Sopron players
Brescia Calcio players
Debreceni VSC players
Ascoli Calcio 1898 F.C. players
Calcio Padova players
Fehérvár FC players
Vasas SC players
Nemzeti Bajnokság I players
Nemzeti Bajnokság II players
Jeonnam Dragons players
Adanaspor footballers
Serie A players
Serie B players
K League 1 players
TFF First League players
Hungarian expatriate footballers
Expatriate footballers in Italy
Hungarian expatriate sportspeople in Italy
Sportspeople from Pest County